Ditrigona margarita is a moth in the family Drepanidae. It was described by Wilkinson in 1968. It is found in China.

References

Moths described in 1968
Drepaninae
Moths of Asia